Japhet Sery Larsen (born 10 April 2000) is a Danish professional footballer who plays for SK Brann as a centre-back.

Sery is a product of the FC Midtjylland academy and began his senior career with the club in 2020. He transferred to Norwegian club SK Brann in 2021 and to FK Bodø/Glimt in 2022, before returning to SK Brann in 2023. Sery has been capped by Denmark at youth level. His nickname is "Jeff".

Club career

FC Midtjylland 
A central defender, Sery began his career with spells at CIK, KB, B93 and Lyngby, before joining the academy at Superliga club FC Midtjylland in July 2015. He progressed to sign a contract extension in January 2018 and was a part of the club's 2017–18 and 2018–19 U19 Ligaen-winning squads. Sery was an unused substitute for the first team on one occasion during the 2018–19 season and signed a five-year professional contract in 2019.

On 21 June 2019, Sery joined the B team at Championship club Brentford on loan for the duration of the 2019–20 season. He was an unused substitute for the first team during a 1–0 FA Cup third round victory over Stoke City on 4 January 2020.

Sery returned to Midtjylland to begin the 2020–21 season as a member of the first team squad. He made 8 appearances during the season and scored one goal, in a 3–0 win over OB on 10 March 2021. Sery left the club in July 2021.

SK Brann 
On 24 July 2021, Sery moved to Norway to sign a -year contract with Eliteserien club SK Brann. After making his debut eight days later with a start in a 3–0 Norwegian Cup second round win over Fana, Sery missed five weeks due to requiring surgery for appendicitis. He made 9 appearances and scored one goal during the remainder of the 2021 season, which culminated in relegation after defeat in the 2021 Eliteserien relegation play-offs. Sery departed the club in February 2022.

FK Bodø/Glimt 
On 2 February 2022, Sery signed a three-year contract with reigning Eliteserien champions FK Bodø/Glimt. Either side of two months out with an injury suffered in July 2022, Sery made 19 appearances during the 2022 season and departed the club in January 2023.

Return to SK Brann 
On 25 January 2023, Sery returned to SK Brann and signed a four-year contract. In his absence, the club had been promoted back to the Eliteserien.

International career 
Sery has been capped by Denmark at U16, U17, U18, U19 and U21 level.

Personal life 
Sery grew up in Herlev and is of Ivorian descent. As a youth, he competed in track and field for Sparta.

Career statistics

References

External links 
 
 
 
 

Living people
2000 births
Place of birth missing (living people)
Association football central defenders
Denmark under-21 international footballers
Danish men's footballers
Danish expatriate men's footballers
Denmark youth international footballers
Kjøbenhavns Boldklub players
Boldklubben af 1893 players
Lyngby Boldklub players
FC Midtjylland players
Brentford F.C. players
SK Brann players
Danish Superliga players
Danish expatriate sportspeople in England
Danish expatriate sportspeople in Norway
Danish expatriates in England
Danish expatriates in Norway
Expatriate footballers in England
Expatriate footballers in Norway
FK Bodø/Glimt players
Danish people of Ivorian descent